Skansen (Skansen stasjon) is a railway station located at Ila in Trondheim, Norway. It is on the Dovre Line (Dovrebanen), 1.20 kilometers from Trondheim Central Station. Service to the station is provided though the Trøndelag Commuter Rail operated by SJ Norge and regional trains to Røros Station. It was opened in 1893. The station is located in a residential area. It is the only railway station in Trondheim to have connections with the Trondheim Tramway. It is also served by city buses.

Tram stop
The Trondheim Tramway's Gråkallen Line stops at a tram stop about 50 meters from the railway station. The tram stop dates back to the original construction of the first tram line in Trondheim, the Ila Line, in 1893.

See also
Skansen Bridge

References

Railway stations in Trondheim
Railway stations on the Dovre Line
Railway stations opened in 1893
1893 establishments in Norway
Trondheim Tramway stations